The men's marathon event at the 1950 British Empire Games was held on 11 February in Auckland, New Zealand, with start and finish at the Eden Park.

Results

References

Athletics at the 1950 British Empire Games
1950